M113 or M-113 may refer to:

 M113 Armored Personnel Carrier
 Variants of the M113 armored personnel carrier
 Mercedes-Benz M113 engine
 M-113 (Michigan highway), a state highway in Michigan
 a fictional planet where the M-113 Creature, an alien creature appearing in "The Man Trap" episode of Star Trek: The Original Series, lives